Federico Jorge Jiménez Losantos (born 15 September 1951),  also known by his initials FJL, is a Spanish radio presenter and right-wing pundit, being most known for his successful radio talk show Es la mañana de Federico. He is also a TV host and literary and non-fiction author. A member of extreme-left organizations and participant in Barcelona's counter-cultural scene in the 1970s, he experienced a radical rightward drift, eventually becoming a journalistic guru for a far-right audience.

Early life
Born in Orihuela del Tremedal, Teruel, on 15 September 1951, to a family of educators. He studied at a high school in Teruel, where he was a student of José Antonio Labordeta (who reportedly considered Losantos "like a son" at the time and later wondered about his personal "transformation") and José Sanchis Sinisterra. He was a resident at Colegio Menor "San Pablo", and earned a silver medal of Student Merit and the third class of the "Colegio Pizarro" literary award.

Jiménez Losantos arrived to Barcelona at age 20, and he studied Philosophy and Letters (section Romance Philology) at the University of Barcelona, earning a licentiate degree by reading a dissertation about Valle Inclán. He was a member of Bandera Roja  and the PSUC during his spell in Barcelona. Disenchanted as result of a journey to Maoist China and the reading of The Gulag Archipelago, he distanced himself from communism in 1976.

Together with Alberto Cardín, he founded  Revista de Literatura (1974)—the "most Lacanian" publication at the time in Spain— and Diwan (1978).

He left Catalonia and moved to Madrid after the attack. He worked as a literature teacher at the Instituto Lope de Vega high school in the Spanish capital.

Career in journalism
He was hired as Op-Ed Editor of the Diario 16 newspaper. He then worked for Antena 3 Radio, and later for the COPE radio network of the Spanish Catholic church. After a year in Miami, he returned to Spain and took charge of La Linterna, a night programme on COPE radio. In 2003 he became director of La Mañana, also on COPE, and became increasingly popular in the morning radio. With La Mañana he became one of the most listened-to radio talk show hosts in Spain until he parted ways in July 2009.

He was one of the founders of La Ilustración Liberal magazine.

In 2000, together with the likes of Javier Rubio Navarro, José María Marco, Alberto Recarte, Carlos Rodríguez Braun and Pedro Schwartz, Losantos helped to create Libertad Digital, a markedly partisan right-leaning and anti-socialist online newspaper. Half of the seed capital was provided by the Grupo Intereconomía.

He is also a regular columnist for El Mundo and has written several books, mostly on political topics. He also debuted in poetry with a book of haikus. In 2005 he started 'The Spain Herald', an English-language digest of articles from Libertad Digital which has been off-line since June 2006.

He has been successfully prosecuted on a number of occasions for defamatory pronouncements. Including a quarrel filed by Alberto Ruiz-Gallardón, and being legally prompted, along with his employers COPE, to pay compensation of 60,000 euros to Esquerra Republicana de Catalunya.
In 2009, after the discomfort that Losantos' outspoken and uncompromising editorial line was creating in the COPE (deeply critical of the former Spanish premier Zapatero, but, somewhat surprisingly for Spain's partisan politics, equally critical of the conservative opposition, which he chastises as being bland and lacking a real alternative project), he did not accept the new role he was offered by this radio station and announced he was moving, among others, to create his own radio station, esRadio, to be launched in September of that same year.

Losantos received the Antena de Oro award in 2022.

Ideology and views 

He was one of the figures from among the Conservative camp (along, for example, José María Aznar) who tried to vindicate the figure of Manuel Azaña in the mid 1990s, partially justified by the bad feelings of the republican politician towards the so-called "peripheral nationalisms".

He has acrimoniously derided the left-wing political parties in Spain for an alleged renouncement to the "idea of Spain" and lack of State project. A harsh opponent of Catalan nationalism, he has decried language policy in Catalonia as a "cultural genocide". He has fiercely criticised the cultural policies implemented by the regional administrations of the autonomous communities of Spain.

He was among the leading publics figures promoting the conspiracy theory about the authorship of the 11-M terrorist attacks in Madrid in 2004, and he even got to the point of purging critics of the conspiracy theory off from the informative services of COPE.

He endorsed Rosa Díez in the campaign for the 2011 general election.

He has declared to be an atheist.
In 2021, he had a row with the anti-vax movement whom he deemed as "" (roughly translating to 'ultra-fuddy-duddy bleach drinkers') and claimed that "murderers" are "those who do not vaccinate their children and deny that vaccines save lives".

Style 
His style has been described as "vehement and aggressive". He has been noted by his ability to create hurtful nicknames to deride his "enemies". He regularly uses the stylistic device of relating the meteorological situation at a given time to the ongoing affairs in Spain.

Works 
Essays

References
Informational notes

Citations

Bibliography
 
 
 
 
 
 
 

1951 births
Living people
Conservatism in Spain
Spanish opinion journalists
Cadena COPE
Spanish nationalists
2004 Madrid train bombings conspiracy theorists
Spanish anti-communists
Spanish male writers
Spanish essayists
Critics of multiculturalism
Male essayists
Male critics of feminism
University of Barcelona alumni
Spanish radio personalities
Spanish radio journalists
20th-century Spanish writers
Spanish radio people
Spanish atheists
Former Marxists
Spanish conspiracy theorists
Diario 16 people
El Mundo (Spain) people
ABC (newspaper) people
Anti-Masonry
Spanish high school teachers
Spanish journalists